Zinedin Mustedanagić (born 1 August 1998) is a Bosnian professional footballer who plays as a midfielder for Druga HNL  club Vukovar 1991.

Club career

Sparta Prague
Mustedanagić started playing football at his local club Sloga Bosanska Otoka before moving very early to the Bubamara academy in Novi Grad, connected to Sloboda Novi Grad.  In 2011 he moved abroad to Sparta Prague's youth academy, with whom he signed his first professional contract in August 2015. He made his professional debut in a cup game against České Budějovice on 12 October 2016 at the age of 18. Two weeks later, he made his league debut in a 4–0 home win against Příbram.

On 25 January 2017, Mustedanagić signed a new three-year deal with the club. 

Two days later, he was sent on a year-long loan to Dukla Prague. During the loan, on 11 March, he scored his first professional goal against Jablonec, which ensured his team a triumph.

In August 2018, Mustedanagić was loaned to Slovak Fortuna liga club Ružomberok. It was said, that he re-joined David Holoubek, who previously served as a youth manager in Sparta, to advance Mustedanagić in his career, as well as to increase his play-time due to an overload of players in Sparta's senior team.

In Slovakia, Mustedanagić immediately became a starting-XI player and a crucial part of the team, playing in his preferred position, as an attacking midfielder. In his debut match against Spartak Trnava,  that concluded as a goal-less tie, on 26 August 2018, Mustedanagić played the entire match and was booked with a yellow card. He scored his first header goal against Nitra over a month later, after a cross from Peter Gál-Andrezly. By the end of the season he scored 4 more league goals (plus 2 more in the Slovak Cup against FK Gerlachov), including one against Slovan Bratislava, in an unexpected 3–2 win over the season's champions.

This marked the first competitive defeat for Slovan at the newly reconstructed Tehelné pole and meant, that after 16 rounds Ružomberok re-gained the 3rd place in the table overcoming Žilina, to the place guaranteeing them a spot in the qualifying round of next season's Europa League. Ružomberok managed to hold on to that position in the remaining three fixtures of the season.

During the second part of 2019, Mustedanagić was loaned to Czech First League club České Budějovice.

Sarajevo
In January 2020, Mustedanagić was sent on a loan to Bosnian Premier League Sarajevo. He made his official debut for Sarajevo in a 6–2 league win against Tuzla City on 22 February 2020. On 1 June 2020, Mustedanagić won his first league title with Sarajevo, though after the 2019–20 Bosnian Premier League season was ended abruptly due to the COVID-19 pandemic in Bosnia and Herzegovina and after which Sarajevo were by default crowned league champions for a second consecutive time.

On 17 July 2020, he permanently joined Sarajevo after the club bought out his contract with Sparta, signing a three-year contract. Mustedanagić scored his first goal for the club on 30 October 2020, in a league match against Mladost Doboj Kakanj.

In June 2021, he terminated his contract with Sarajevo, leaving the club.

International career
Mustedanagić represented Bosnia and Herzegovina on all youth levels. He also served as captain of the under-17 and under-19 teams.

Personal life
Zinedin is a cousin of former Yugoslav international player Džemal Mustedanagić.

Career statistics

Club

Honours
Sarajevo
Bosnian Premier League: 2019–20
Bosnian Cup: 2020–21

References

External links

1998 births
Living people
People from Bosanska Krupa
Bosniaks of Bosnia and Herzegovina
Bosnia and Herzegovina Muslims
Bosnia and Herzegovina footballers
Bosnia and Herzegovina youth international footballers
Bosnia and Herzegovina under-21 international footballers
Bosnia and Herzegovina expatriate footballers
Association football midfielders
AC Sparta Prague players
FK Dukla Prague players
MFK Ružomberok players
SK Dynamo České Budějovice players
FK Sarajevo players
KF Vllaznia Shkodër players
Czech First League players
Slovak Super Liga players
Kategoria Superiore players
First Football League (Croatia) players
Premier League of Bosnia and Herzegovina players
Expatriate footballers in the Czech Republic
Expatriate footballers in Slovakia
Expatriate footballers in Albania
Bosnia and Herzegovina expatriate sportspeople in the Czech Republic
Bosnia and Herzegovina expatriate sportspeople in Slovakia
Bosnia and Herzegovina expatriate sportspeople in Albania